Helene D. Gayle (born August 16, 1955) is an American Physician who is the president of Spelman College. She formerly served as CEO of the Chicago Community Trust, one of the nation's leading community foundations.

Biography
Helene Gayle was born in Buffalo, New York, to Jacob Gayle, a small-business owner, and Marietta Gayle, a social worker. She attended Barnard College of Columbia University, from which she graduated with honors with a B.A. in psychology. She earned an M.D. at the University of Pennsylvania School of Medicine and an M.P.H. at Johns Hopkins University School of Hygiene and Public Health (now the Bloomberg School). She is board certified in pediatrics, having completed a residency in pediatric medicine at Children's National Medical Center in Washington, D.C. Gayle completed a second residency in preventive medicine at the Centers for Disease Control and Prevention.  

Beginning in 1984, Gayle spent 20 years with the Centers for Disease Control and Prevention (CDC), focusing on global health and infectious disease prevention and control, especially HIV/AIDS. On assignment from CDC from 1992 to 1994, Gayle served as the AIDS coordinator and chief of the HIV/AIDS Division at the United States Agency for International Development (USAID). In 1995, she was appointed as the first director of the newly created National Center on HIV, TB and STD Prevention (NCHSTP).  During that time, she was named an Assistant Surgeon General and Rear Admiral in the United States Public Health Service.

Initially on loan from the CDC, she directed the HIV, TB, and Reproductive Health Program at the Bill & Melinda Gates Foundation from 2001 to 2006. During her 5 years as director, she was responsible for research, policy, public awareness, and programs on HIV/AIDS, TB, STDs and reproductive health around the world.  

Gayle was president and CEO of the international humanitarian organization CARE from 2006 to 2015. She led efforts to empower girls and women around the world to bring lasting change to poor communities. Under her leadership, CARE strengthened its focus on advocacy efforts and policy work to have a long-term impact on reducing poverty across the globe. Under her leadership, Gayle introduced signature programs that focused on financial inclusion, maternal health and improving girls' access to quality primary education.

From 2015 to 2017, Gayle was president and CEO of McKinsey Social Initiative (now McKinsey.org), a nonprofit that brings together diverse stakeholders to address complex global social challenges.  

In 2017, Gayle became CEO of the Chicago Community Trust (the Trust), one of the nation's oldest and largest community foundations. Under her leadership, the trust adopted a new strategic focus on closing the racial and ethnic wealth gap in the Chicago region. The three-part strategy to close this gap centers around growing household wealth, catalyzing neighborhood investment and building collective power. Gayle is recognized internationally as an expert on health, global development, and humanitarian issues. She was named one of Forbes' "100 Most Powerful Women," one of NonProfit Times' "Power and Influence Top 50," and of Chicago Magazine's "Chicago's 50 Most Powerful Women." She been featured by media outlets like The New York Times, The Washington Post, ForbesWoman, Glamour, O magazine, National Public Radio, and CNN.

Gayle has received 18 honorary degrees and held affiliate and adjunct faculty appointments at the University of Washington and Emory University She has published numerous scientific articles on global and domestic public health issues, poverty alleviation, gender equality, and social justice. 

On April 25, 2022, it was announced that Gayle was a candidate to succeed Mary Schmidt Campbell as the 11th president of liberal arts HBCU Spelman College. She began her tenure on June 1, 2022.

Current board memberships
Center for Strategic and International Studies Board of Trustees, 2007 – present
Colgate-Palmolive Board, 2010 – present
ONE Board, 2006 – present
Rockefeller Foundation Board of Trustees, 2009 – present
Coca-Cola, 2013 – present
Brookings Institution, 2015–present
New America, 2013 – present
Federal Reserve Bank of Chicago, Board Chair, 2019 – 2022
Economic Club of Chicago , 2019 – 
Inter-American Dialogue, 2018 – present
Palo Alto Networks, Effective May 25, 2021

Professional society memberships
Council on Foreign Relations
Institute of Medicine
Delta Omega Society
American Public Health Association
National Medical Association
American Medical Women's Association
Society for Public Health Education

Honorary degrees
American University, Doctor of Science, 2018
Xavier University of Louisiana, Doctor of Science, 2016
University of Buffalo, Doctor of Science, 2016
University of Miami, Doctor of Science, 2013
Oberlin College, Doctor of Science, 2011
Colby College, Doctor of Humane Letters, 2010
Columbia University, Doctor of Laws, 2009
Agnes Scott College, Doctor of Science, 2009
Brandeis University, Doctor of Humane Letters, 2008
Morehouse School of Medicine, Doctor of Science, 2008
Mount Sinai School of Medicine of New York University, Doctor of Humane Letters, 2008
Duke University, Doctor of Science, 2008
Meharry Medical College, Doctor of Science 2007
Smith College, Doctor of Science, 2007
Pennsylvania State University, Doctor of Science, 2004
Jackson State University, Doctor of Humane Letters, 2004

Awards and honors
Teachers College, Columbia University, Medal for Distinguished Service, 2018
Johns Hopkins University Society of Scholars, inducted 2017
American Public Health Association Presidential Citation Award, 2015
WNBA Inspiration Award, 2015
Jimmy and Rosslyn Carter Humanitarian Award, National Foundation for Infectious Diseases, 2012
Forbes Magazine 100 Most Powerful Women, 2014
The NonProfit Times Power and Influence Top 50, 2011
Bryn Mawr College, Katharine Hepburn Award, 2011
AARP Inspire Award, 2010
Bennett High Alumni Honor Roll, 2010
Georgia State University, Ethics Advocate Award, 2009
Business to Business Magazine, Women of Excellence Award, 2009
100 Most Influential Atlantans Award, 2009
Ivan Allen College, Georgia Institute of Technology, Ivan Allen Jr. Prize for Social Courage, 2009
South African Partners, Desmond Tutu Award, 2009
Morehouse College, Coca-Cola Leadership Award, 2008
Americans for Informed Democracy, Innovator in International Development Award, 2008
Cable Positive, Humanitarian of the Year Award, 2008
Wall Street Journal, "50 Women to Watch", 2006
Eleanor Roosevelt Val-Kill Medal, 2006
Helen H. Jackson, Woman of Valor Award, 2006
Arthur Ashe Institute for Urban Health, Leadership in Global Medicine Award, 2005
Women of Color, Health Science & Technology Awards: Medical Leadership in Industry, 2002
National Medical Association, Scroll of Merit Award, 2000
Women Looking Ahead, Inc., The Women Looking Ahead (WLA) 100s List Award, 1999
100 Black Men of America, Inc., Woman of the Year Award, 1999
U.S. Department of Health and Human Services, Secretary's Award for Distinguished Service, 1999, 2001
Atlanta Business League, Women of Influence Award, 1998
U.S. Public Service Foreign Duty Service Award, 1997
U.S. Public Health Meritorious Service Medal, 1996
Columbia University Medal of Excellence, 1996
National Coalition of 100 Black Women, Inc., Service Award, 1999
Who's Who Among Black Americans, 1990, 1993 and 1994

References

External links

1955 births
American humanitarians
Women humanitarians
American nonprofit chief executives
American women chief executives
Barnard College alumni
Directors of The Coca-Cola Company
HIV/AIDS researchers
Johns Hopkins Bloomberg School of Public Health alumni
Living people
New America (organization)
Perelman School of Medicine at the University of Pennsylvania alumni
Women nonprofit executives
African-American women physicians
African-American physicians
21st-century African-American people
21st-century African-American women
20th-century African-American people
20th-century African-American women
Members of the Inter-American Dialogue
Members of the National Academy of Medicine